Michael Ward (born 10 February 1991) is an Ireland international rugby league footballer who plays as a  for the Batley Bulldogs in the Betfred Championship.

He previously played for Oldham in League 1 and the Championship.

Background
Ward was born in Oldham, Greater Manchester, England.

Career
In 2016, he was called up to the Ireland squad for the 2017 Rugby League World Cup European Pool B qualifiers.

Ward previously played for the Oldham in the Kingstone Press Championship.

References

External links

Oldham profile
Ireland profile

1991 births
Living people
Batley Bulldogs players
English rugby league players
English people of Irish descent
Ireland national rugby league team players
Oldham R.L.F.C. players
Rugby league players from Oldham
Rugby league props